Marcus Green may refer to:
 Marcus Green (defensive tackle) (born 1983), American football defensive tackle
 Marcus Green (wide receiver) (born 1996), American football wide receiver